Ulee's Gold is a 1997 American drama film written and directed by Victor Nuñez and starring Peter Fonda in the title role. Co-stars include Patricia Richardson, Christine Dunford, Tom Wood, Jessica Biel, J. Kenneth Campbell and Vanessa Zima. It was released by Orion Pictures, with Jonathan Demme receiving presenter credits for his role in the film's financing.

The film was the "Centerpiece Premiere" at the 1997 Sundance Film Festival. Fonda won a Golden Globe Award for his performance and was also nominated for an Academy Award for Best Actor and a Screen Actors Guild Award.

The film's title refers most concretely to the honey Ulee produces as a beekeeper, particularly that made from the nectar of the tupelo tree.

Van Morrison sings "Tupelo Honey" (the title song of his 1971 album) over the end credits.

Plot
Ulee Jackson is a widowed beekeeper in Wewahitchka, Florida whose son Jimmy is in prison following a botched robbery. Jimmy's wife Helen has abandoned their two daughters and is living in Orlando. Ulee's stubborn independence prevents him from asking for help, and he has his hands full running his business and acting as surrogate parent to his granddaughters Casey and Penny. Casey is a rebellious teenager and Penny is a timid 10-year-old who seems confused by her parents' absence and the tension at home.

When Ulee visits Jimmy in prison, Jimmy tells him that Helen has turned up at the Orlando home of petty criminals Eddie Flowers and Ferris Dooley. They were Jimmy's accomplices in the bank robbery, but were never caught. Now they say Helen is sick, and Jimmy asks Ulee to bring her home.

Ulee goes to Orlando to pick up Helen, but it turns out what Eddie and Ferris really want is the bank money that Jimmy allegedly hid after the robbery. Ulee agrees to ask Jimmy about it, and then takes Helen home. Helen's "illness" is actually drug addiction, and while she is almost comatose on the way home, she becomes violent and belligerent as she wakes up near the house. Ulee's tenant and neighbor, a divorced nurse named Connie Hope, is brought into the home by a frightened Penny, and over the next few days she helps Helen through her drug withdrawal.

Meanwhile, Ulee learns that Jimmy hid the bank money in one of his beeyards. He tells Eddie and Ferris he'll bring the money to Orlando in a few days, but they decide they can't wait and take Helen, Casey, and Penny hostage in Ulee's home. Helen, Casey, and Penny are then tied up and left at the home as Eddie and Ferris force Ulee at gunpoint to take them to the beeyard, where he shows them the hiding place. As they are recovering the money, Ulee kicks the gun into the swamp. The angry men ride with Ulee back into town, then Eddie stabs him in the parking lot when they arrive. As Ulee stumbles bleeding, Eddie and Ferris drive off but are pulled over almost immediately by the sheriff, Bill Floyd.

In a newly hopeful Jackson household, Helen has stepped back into her role as a mother, and Jimmy expects to be paroled soon. Ulee is happy to return to his bees, but has mixed feelings about giving up some of his responsibilities.  As he recovers from his knife wound he begins work on expanding his business to accommodate Jimmy's eventual return, and seems to finally be taking a romantic interest in Connie.

Cast
 Peter Fonda as Ulee Jackson
 Patricia Richardson as Connie Hope
 Christine Dunford as Helen Jackson
 Tom Wood as Jimmy Jackson
 Jessica Biel as Casey Jackson
 Vanessa Zima as Penny Jackson
 Steven Flynn as Eddie Flowers
 Dewey Weber as Ferris Dooley
 J. Kenneth Campbell as Sheriff Bill Floyd
 Traber Burns as Chance Barrow
 Ryan Marshall as Charley Myers

Production
Nuñez used the Lanier family, a third-generation beekeeping family in Wewahitchka, Florida as "bee consultants" for the film; the Lanier family swamp lands and bee yards served as filming locations, with some members of the family appearing as extras in the film. Other filming locations were Orlando, Carrabelle, Apalachicola and Port St. Joe in Florida. Ulee's Gold was filmed during the late summer/early autumn of 1996.

During a 1997 interview held in Melbourne, Fonda commented on the character he portrayed:

The film would help revive Fonda's career.

Reception
Ulee's Gold was well received by critics. On the review aggregator website Rotten Tomatoes, it has an approval rating of 94% based on reviews from 51 critics, with an average rating of 8.1/10. The website's consensus reads, "Led by an outstanding Peter Fonda performance, Ulee's Gold movingly depicts a family in crisis -- and a patriarch willing to sacrifice for the good of others." On Metacritic, it has a score of 77 out of 100 based on reviews from 23 critics, indicating "generally favorable reviews". Audiences polled by CinemaScore gave the film a grade "B+" on scale of A to F.

Andrew Johnston wrote in Time Out New York: "The plot poses ample opportunities for cliches, all of which Nunez deftly avoids. The characters are wonderfully drawn and bring out the best in the actors —the taciturn Fonda often seems to be channeling his father, and Richardson proves she's too talented to be wasting her time on Home Improvement". Varietys Todd McCarthy described the film as a "gem of rare emotional depth and integrity". Roger Ebert of 
the Chicago Sun-Times gave it 3.5 out of 4, and wrote: "Peter Fonda here reveals a depth of talent we did not suspect."

Accolades

Notes

References

External links
 
 

1997 films
1997 drama films
American drama films
American independent films
Films set in Florida
Orion Pictures films
Fictional beekeepers
Films featuring a Best Drama Actor Golden Globe winning performance
Films about bees
Films directed by Victor Nuñez
1997 independent films
1990s English-language films
1990s American films
English-language drama films